The 2005–06 Georgian Cup (also known as the David Kipiani Cup) was the sixty-second season overall and sixteenth since independence of the Georgian annual football tournament. The competition began on 23 August 2005 and ended with the Final held on 13 May 2006. The defending champions are Locomotive Tbilisi.

Round of 32 

|}

Round of 16 

|}

Quarterfinals 

|}

Semifinals 

|}

Final

See also 
 2005–06 Umaglesi Liga
 2005–06 Pirveli Liga

References

External links 
 The Rec.Sport.Soccer Statistics Foundation.
 es.geofootball.com  

Georgian Cup seasons
Cup
Georgian Cup, 2005-06